The Hollies are a British rock and pop band, formed in 1962. One of the leading British groups of the 1960s and into the mid-1970s, they are known for their distinctive three-part vocal harmony style. Allan Clarke and Graham Nash founded the band as a Merseybeat-type group in Manchester, although some of the band members came from towns further north in East Lancashire. Nash left the group in 1968 to form Crosby, Stills & Nash, though he has reunited with the Hollies on occasion.

They enjoyed considerable popularity in the UK and Europe during the mid-1960s with a string of hit singles that included "Just One Look" (1964), "Here I Go Again" (1964), "I'm Alive" (1965; their first of two UK number-ones), "Look Through Any Window" (1965) and "I Can't Let Go" (1966), although they did not achieve US chart success until "Bus Stop" was released in 1966. The group went on to have periodic success on both sides of the Atlantic over the next decade with hits such as "Stop Stop Stop" (1966), "On a Carousel" (1967), "Carrie Anne" (1967), "He Ain't Heavy, He's My Brother" (1969), "Long Cool Woman in a Black Dress" (1972) and "The Air That I Breathe" (1974). "He Ain't Heavy" reached number-one on the UK Singles Chart following a 1988 re-release. Overall, the Hollies had over 30 charting singles on the UK Singles Chart, 22 on the Billboard Hot 100, and 21 in Canada.

The Hollies are one of the few UK groups of the early 1960s, along with the Rolling Stones, who have never disbanded and continue to record and perform. In recognition of their achievements, the Hollies were inducted into the Rock and Roll Hall of Fame in 2010.

Origin
The Hollies originated as a duo formed by Allan Clarke and Graham Nash, who were best friends from primary school and began performing together during the skiffle craze of the late 1950s. Eventually Clarke and Nash became a vocal and guitar duo modelled on American duo the Everly Brothers under the names "Ricky and Dane Young". Under this name, they teamed up with a local band, the Fourtones, consisting of Pete Bocking on guitar, John 'Butch' Mepham on bass, Keith Bates on drums, and Derek Quinn on guitar. When Quinn quit to join Freddie and the Dreamers in 1962, Clarke and Nash also quit and joined another Manchester band, the Deltas, consisting of Vic Steele on lead guitar, Eric Haydock on bass guitar, and Don Rathbone on drums, which had just lost two members including Eric Stewart, who left to join a "professional" band, the Mindbenders. During these periods the group were managed and promoted by Michael Cohen, a music enthusiast and clothing retailer from Oldham.

The Deltas first called themselves The Hollies for a December 1962 gig at the Oasis Club in Manchester. It has been suggested that Eric Haydock named the group in relation to a Christmas holly garland, though in a 2009 interview Graham Nash said that the group decided just prior to a performance to call themselves The Hollies because of their admiration for Buddy Holly. In 2009, Nash wrote, "We called ourselves The Hollies, after Buddy and Christmas."

1963–1968

In January 1963, the Hollies performed at the Cavern Club in Liverpool, where they were seen by Parlophone assistant producer Ron Richards, who had been involved in producing the first Beatles session. Richards offered them an audition with Parlophone, but Steele did not want to be a "professional" musician and left the band in April 1963. For the audition, they brought in Tony Hicks to replace the departing Steele. Hicks played in a Nelson band called the Dolphins, which also featured Bobby Elliott on drums and Bernie Calvert on bass. Not only were the Hollies signed by Richards, who continued to produce the band until 1976 and once more in 1979, but a song from the audition, a cover of the Coasters' 1961 single "(Ain't That) Just Like Me", was released as their debut single in May 1963 and hit No. 25 on the UK Singles Chart.

Their second single, another cover of the Coasters, this time 1957's "Searchin'", hit No. 12. At this point, after recording only eight songs for Parlophone, Rathbone also decided to leave the band, and Hicks was able to arrange for his Dolphins bandmate Bobby Elliott to replace him as the Hollies' new drummer in August 1963. They then scored their first British Top 10 hit in early 1964 with a cover of Maurice Williams and the Zodiacs' "Stay", which reached No. 8 in the UK. It was lifted from the band's Parlophone debut album, Stay with The Hollies, released on 1 January 1964, which went to No. 2 on the UK album chart.

The Hollies became known for doing cover versions, and they followed up with "Just One Look" (February 1964, UK No. 2), a song that had already had top 10 success in the US for Soul star Doris Troy. The hits continued with "Here I Go Again" (May 1964, UK No. 4). At this point, there was some North American interest in the group, and versions of Stay with The Hollies, with these two singles added, were issued in both Canada (by Capitol Records) and the US (by Imperial Records), with the title changed to Here I Go Again. Like their Parlophone labelmates the Beatles, the Hollies' albums released in North America remained very different from their UK counterparts.

By this time, the Hollies were writing and performing a substantial amount of original material, written by the group's songwriting team of Clarke, Nash, and Hicks, and producer Richards finally permitted the group to release its first self-penned hit, "We're Through" (Sep. 1964, UK No. 7) (credited to a pseudonym, "L. Ransford", the name of Graham Nash's grandfather, as were all their early compositions). This was followed by two more cover versions, "Yes I Will" (Jan. 1965, UK No. 9) and finally the Clint Ballard, Jr.-penned "I'm Alive" (May 1965, the band's first UK No. 1, US No. 103, Canada No. 11). Their second album, In The Hollies Style (1964), did not chart in the Record Retailer top ten album chart, although it did feature in the New Musical Express album chart, making the top ten. None of the tracks from the album were released in the US, although a version of it was released in Canada, with the addition of the British singles.

Finally, the Hollies broke through in North America with an original song that they requested from Manchester's Graham Gouldman. "Look Through Any Window" (September 1965, UK No. 4) broke the Hollies into the US Top 40 (No. 32, Jan. 1966) and into the Canadian top 10 (No. 3, Jan. 1966), both for the first time. Their follow-up single, an original recording of George Harrison's new song "If I Needed Someone" (December 1965), was undercut when the Beatles decided to release their own version on the UK album Rubber Soul; it only reached No. 20 in the UK and was not released in North America. Their third album, simply called Hollies, hit No. 8 in the UK in 1965 but, under the name Hear! Here!, failed to chart in the US despite its inclusion of "Look Through Any Window" and "I'm Alive".

The Hollies then returned to the UK Top 10 with "I Can't Let Go" (Feb. 1966, UK No. 2, US No. 42). Their fourth album, Would You Believe? which included the hit, made it to No. 16 in 1966. Released in the US as Beat Group!, it also failed to crack the US top 100.

At this point, a dispute between the Hollies and their management broke out over what bass guitarist Eric Haydock contended were excessive fees being charged to the group by management. As a result, Haydock decided to take a leave of absence from the group. While he was gone, the group brought in the Beatles' good friend Klaus Voormann to play on a few gigs and recorded two singles with fill-ins on bass: the Burt Bacharach-Hal David song "After the Fox" (Sep. 1966), which featured Peter Sellers on vocals, Jack Bruce on electric bass and Burt Bacharach himself on keyboards, and was the theme song from the Sellers film of the same name (which failed to chart), and "Bus Stop" (UK No. 5, US No. 5, June 1966), another Gouldman song, which featured Bernie Calvert, a former bandmate of Hicks and Elliott in the Dolphins, on bass. Calvert also played a tour of Yugoslavia with the band in May 1966.

"Bus Stop" gave the Hollies their first US top ten single. As a result, a US/Canadian Bus Stop album, made of the single mixed with unreleased songs from earlier in the band's career, climbed to No. 75—the group's first album to enter the US Top 100. Although Haydock ultimately proved to be correct about the fee dispute, he was sacked in early July 1966 in favour of Calvert after "Bus Stop" became a huge hit.

At the time of Haydock's departure, Clarke, Nash and Hicks participated (along with session guitarist Jimmy Page, bass guitarist John Paul Jones and pianist Elton John) in the recording of the Everly Brothers' 1966 album Two Yanks in England, which consisted largely of covers of "L. Ransford" compositions. After the Everly Brothers album, the Hollies stopped publishing original songs under a pseudonym, and from this point until Nash's last single with the Hollies in 1968, all of their single A-sides were original compositions, except the final Nash era single 'Listen To Me' (1968) which was written by Tony Hazzard.

In October 1966, the group's fifth album, For Certain Because (UK No. 23, 1966), became their first album consisting entirely of original compositions by Clarke, Nash and Hicks. Released in the US as Stop! Stop! Stop!, it reached No. 91 there and spawned a US release-only single, "Pay You Back with Interest", which was a modest hit, peaking at No. 28. Another track, "Tell Me to My Face", was a moderate hit by Mercury artist Keith, and was also covered a decade later by Dan Fogelberg and Tim Weisberg on their Twin Sons of Different Mothers album.

Meanwhile, the Hollies continued to release a steady stream of international hit singles: "Stop Stop Stop" (Oct. 1966, UK No. 2, US No. 7) from For Certain Because, known for its distinctive banjo arrangement; "On a Carousel" (Feb. 1967; UK No. 4, 1967, US No. 11, Australia No. 14); "Carrie Anne" (May 1967, UK No. 3, US No. 9, Australia No. 7).

In mid-February 1967, Bobby Elliott collapsed on stage due to an inflamed appendix. The Hollies were forced to continue their touring commitments without him, using Tony Mansfield, Dougie Wright and Tony Newman as stand-ins for further live dates, and Wright, Mitch Mitchell and Clem Cattini when they began recording for their next album, Evolution, which was released on 1 June 1967, the same day as the Beatles' Sgt. Pepper's Lonely Hearts Club Band. It was also their first album for their new US label Epic, and reached No. 13 in the UK and No. 43 in the US. The US version included the single "Carrie Anne". In addition, The Searchers and Paul & Barry Ryan each had a minor UK chart hit covering the Evolution song "Have You Ever Loved Somebody" in 1967.

Also in 1967, the Hollies participated in the Festival di San Remo with the song Non prego per me, written by Italian songwriter Lucio Battisti and Italian lyricist Mogol.

Nash's attempt to expand the band's range with a more ambitious composition, "King Midas in Reverse", only reached No. 18 in the UK charts. The Hollies then released the ambitious, psychedelic album Butterfly, retitled for the US market as King Midas in Reverse/Dear Eloise, but it failed to chart. In response, Clarke and Nash wrote a more conventional pop song, "Jennifer Eccles" (named after their wives) (Mar. 1968, UK No. 7, US No. 40, Australia No. 13), which was a hit. The Hollies donated a Clarke-Nash song, "Wings", to No One's Gonna Change Our World, a charity album in aid of the World Wildlife Fund, in 1969.

Graham Nash departure
In addition to his Hollies work, Graham Nash co-wrote John Walker's first solo hit "Annabella" in 1967, and the following year sang on the Scaffold's UK chart-topper, "Lily the Pink" (which referenced "Jennifer Eccles"). The failure of "King Midas in Reverse" had increased tension within the band, with Clarke and Hicks wanting to record more "pop" material than Nash did. Matters reached a head when the band rejected Nash's "Marrakesh Express" and then decided to record an album made up entirely of Bob Dylan covers. Nash did take part in one Dylan cover, "Blowin' in the Wind", but made no secret of his disdain for the idea and repeatedly clashed with producer Ron Richards.

In August 1968, the Hollies recorded "Listen to Me" (written by Tony Hazzard) (Sept. 1968, UK No. 11), which featured Nicky Hopkins on piano. That proved to be Nash's last recording session with the Hollies; he officially left the group to move to Los Angeles, where he tentatively planned to become primarily a songwriter, after a performance in a charity concert at the London Palladium on 8 December 1968. Nash told Disc magazine, "I can't take touring any more. I just want to sit at home and write songs. I don't really care what the rest of the group think." After relocating to Los Angeles, he joined with former Buffalo Springfield guitarist Stephen Stills and ex-Byrds singer and guitarist David Crosby to form one of the first supergroups, Crosby, Stills & Nash, which released "Marrakesh Express" as its debut single.

The B-side of "Listen to Me" was "Do the Best You Can", the last original recording of a Clarke-Hicks-Nash song to appear on a Hollies record (although "Survival of the Fittest", written by Clarke-Hicks-Nash, was re-cut with Terry Sylvester and issued as a US single in 1970).

Graham Nash was replaced in the Hollies in January 1969 by Terry Sylvester, formerly of the Escorts and the Swinging Blue Jeans. Sylvester also substituted for Nash as part of the group's songwriting team, with Clarke and Hicks. As planned before Nash's departure, the group's next album was Hollies Sing Dylan, which reached No. 3 on the UK chart, while the US version, Words and Music by Bob Dylan, was ignored.

Nash's departure saw the Hollies again turn to outside writers for their single A-sides, but the group's British chart fortunes rallied during 1969 and 1970, and they scored four consecutive UK Top 20 hits (including two consecutive Top 5 placings) in this period, beginning with the Geoff Stephens/Tony Macaulay song, "Sorry Suzanne" (Feb. 1969), which reached No. 3 in the UK. The follow-up was the emotional ballad "He Ain't Heavy, He's My Brother" written by Bobby Scott and Bob Russell, which featured the piano playing of Elton John; it reached No. 3 in the UK in October 1969, and No. 7 in the US in March 1970. The next album Hollies Sing Hollies did not chart in the UK, but did well in the USA—where it reached No. 32 after being retitled He Ain't Heavy, He's My Brother and including that song—and in Canada.

1970s

The Hollies' next single, "I Can't Tell the Bottom from the Top", again featured the young Elton John on piano and reached UK No. 7 in May 1970, charting in twelve countries. The UK hits continued with "Gasoline Alley Bred" (written by Cook/Greenaway/Macaulay) (Oct. 1970, UK No. 14, Australia No. 20), while the Tony Hicks song "Too Young to Be Married" – merely an album track in the UK and the US – became a No. 1 single in Australia, New Zealand and Malaysia, also reaching No. 9 in Singapore. Allan Clarke's hard-edged rocker "Hey Willy" made No. 22 in the UK in 1971 and charted in eight other countries.

Like Graham Nash before him, frontman Allan Clarke by 1971 was growing frustrated, and he too began clashing with producer Ron Richards over material; after seeing Nash's success since departing, he was eager to leave the group and cut a solo album. After the 1971 album Distant Light, which concluded the band's EMI/Parlophone contract in the UK (and reached No. 21 on the American Billboard chart), Clarke departed from the Hollies in December, a move which surprised both the band's fans and the public in general.

The Hollies signed with Polydor for the UK/Europe in 1972, although their US contract with Epic still had three more albums to run. Swedish singer Mikael Rickfors, formerly of the group Bamboo (who had supported the Hollies in Sweden in 1967), was quickly recruited by the rest of the band and sang lead on the group's first Polydor single "The Baby" (UK No. 26, March 1972). When Mikael first auditioned for them, he tried to sing in Allan Clarke's higher vocal range, and the results were terrible. The rest of the group decided it might be better to record songs with him starting from scratch. Terry Sylvester and Tony Hicks blended with Rickfors' baritone voice instead of him trying to imitate Clarke's tenor voice. There were rumours that Rickfors couldn't speak a word of English and had to learn the words of "The Baby" phonetically. The rumour about him not knowing English was false, though he did struggle to understand English words that he had not put together.

Meanwhile, in a counter-programming move, Parlophone lifted a Clarke-composed track from the previously-unsuccessful album Distant Light that also featured Clarke on lead vocals and lead guitar, the Creedence Clearwater Revival-inspired "Long Cool Woman in a Black Dress". Parlophone released this as a rival single to "The Baby" in February 1972, although it was only moderately successful in the UK (No. 32). In the US, Epic, which owned the rights to Distant Light but had not released it, finally released the album in April 1972 and the single in May 1972. Surprisingly, the song became a smash hit outside of Europe, peaking at No. 2 in the US (the Hollies' highest-charting single in the US) and Australia.

"Long Dark Road" is another track from Distant Light, with lead vocals by Hicks and the end of the song sung by Rickfors. Both Rickfors and Hicks also swapped their main instruments for the song, with Hicks playing bass and Rickfors lead guitar. Their distinctive three-part harmonies, and a harmonica throughout, was then also released as a US single, reaching No. 26. As a result, Epic pressured Clarke and the Hollies to reform, despite the fact that they had split over a year previously, placing Rickfors in an awkward position.

Meanwhile, the Rickfors-led Hollies released their first album Romany (which reached No. 84 in the US) in October 1972. A second Rickfors-sung single, "Magic Woman Touch" (1972), failed to chart in the UK, becoming the band's first official single to miss the UK charts since 1963, although it did chart in seven other countries, reaching the Top Ten in the Netherlands, New Zealand and Hong Kong. A second Rickfors/Hollies album, Out on the Road (1973), was recorded and issued in Germany. With the US success of Distant Light and its singles, Clarke decided to rejoin the band in the summer of 1973, and Rickfors left. Accordingly, there was no UK or US release of Out on the Road, giving this "lost" Hollies album legendary status among the band's fans—and high prices on the original German release.

After Clarke's return, the Hollies returned to the UK Top 30 with another swamp rock-style song penned by Clarke, "The Day That Curly Billy Shot Down Crazy Sam McGee" (UK No. 24, 1973). In 1974 they scored what was to be their last major new US and UK hit single with the Albert Hammond/Mike Hazlewood-composed love song "The Air That I Breathe" (previously recorded by Hammond and by Phil Everly on his 1973 solo album, Star Spangled Springer), which reached No. 2 in the UK and Australia and made the Top 10 in the US. The single "Another Night", produced by Alan Parsons, which was released after the aforementioned single, appeared on Billboard'''s Rock Singles Best Sellers chart at no. 32 on 28 July 1975 and peaked at no. 71 on the publication's Hot 100.

After the US failure of the Hollies' single "4th of July, Asbury Park", written by Bruce Springsteen, Epic gave up on the Hollies in the US, combining their two 1976 albums into their last US release of the decade, Clarke, Hicks, Sylvester, Calvert, Elliott (again including the Springsteen song to give it one last chance at success).

The Hollies continued to have singles chart hits during the rest of the seventies, although mostly in Europe as well as in New Zealand where they performed and recorded in 1975/76. In 1976, for example, the group released three singles in three different styles, none of which charted in the UK or the US. "Star", an uptempo harmony number reminiscent of their sixties hits, charted only in New Zealand and Australia, the hard rock number "Daddy Don't Mind" charted only in the Netherlands and Germany, and "Wiggle That Wotsit", an excursion into disco territory, charted only in the Netherlands, Sweden, and New Zealand. Especially popular outside the US, always very professional in their continuous concert engagements, the Hollies had album chart successes with compilation albums in 1977 and 1978, which kept them going through the late 1970s.

1980s–1990

In 1980, the Hollies returned to the UK charts with the single "Soldier's Song", written and produced by Mike Batt, which was a minor hit in 1980 reaching No. 58 in the UK. They also released an album of Buddy Holly covers named Buddy Holly which didn't chart in the UK or the US, but did chart in the Netherlands among other places.

In May 1981, Calvert and Sylvester left the group after musical disagreements with Bruce Welch, who was producing them at that time (nothing from the Welch sessions was ever released during this time). Sylvester also disagreed strongly with the band's sacking of their long-time manager Robin Britten. Alan Coates joined the band on rhythm guitar and high harmony vocals shortly afterwards.

The Hollies went back in the studio on 6 June 1981 with singer/writer/guitarist John Miles and session bassist Alan Jones to record "Carrie" and "Driver". But neither one of these songs was released at this time ("Carrie" appeared as the b-side of the re-released "He Ain't Heavy" in 1988).

In August 1981, the remaining Hollies released "Holliedaze" on EMI, a medley edited together by Tony Hicks from their hit records, which returned them to the UK Top 30. At the request of the BBC, Nash and Haydock briefly rejoined in September 1981 to promote the record on Top of the Pops. The Hollies issued their last Polydor single "Take My Love and Run" (written by keyboard player Brian Chatton, who also appeared with the Hollies while they promoted the single on TV) in November 1981 but this failed to chart.

Graham Nash joined them for the recording of an Alan Tarney song, "Somethin' Ain't Right", on 10 September 1982, which led to a proper reunion album, What Goes Around..., issued on WEA Records. Nash continued appearing with the Hollies through early 1984, culminating in the Hollies' last hit in the USA Top 40 with a remake of the Supremes' "Stop in the Name of Love", which reached No. 29 in 1983. "Stop in the Name of Love" was taken from What Goes Around..., which was released in July 1983 and charted in the US on the Billboard top 200 albums at No. 90. A live album featuring the Clarke-Hicks-Elliott-Nash re-grouping, Reunion, was recorded at Kings Island Amusement Park in Ohio, during a US tour that followed that same year, finally being issued first in 1997 as Archive Alive, then retitled Reunion (with two extra tracks) in 2004.

The Hollies continued to tour and perform through the 1980s, by this time reaching classic rock status and drawing crowds around the world to see them. In the mid 80s, the band began to lower the keys of their songs when Clarke began to lose range.

After its use in a TV beer commercial (for Miller Lite lager) in  1988, "He Ain't Heavy" was reissued in the UK and reached No. 1, thus establishing a new record for the length of time between chart-topping singles for one artist of 23 years (the Hollies' only previous UK No. 1 having been 1965's "I'm Alive"). By this time, bassist Ray Stiles, formerly a member of 1970s chart-topping glam rock group Mud, had joined the permanent line-up.

A compilation album, All the Hits & More: The Definitive Collection, was released in 1988 and charted in the UK.

 1990s–present 
In 1993, the Hollies had their 30th anniversary as a band. A compilation album, The Air That I Breathe: The Very Best of The Hollies, charted at No. 15 in the UK. This album included a new single, "The Woman I Love", which charted at No. 42 in the UK. Graham Nash again reunited with the Hollies to record a new version of "Peggy Sue Got Married" that featured prerecorded lead vocals by Buddy Holly, taken from an 'alternate' version of the song given to Nash by Holly's widow, María Elena Holly. This "Buddy Holly & The Hollies" recording opened the Not Fade Away tribute album to Holly by various artists. The Hollies also continued to tour and make TV appearances.

The Hollies were awarded an Ivor Novello Award in 1995 for Outstanding Contribution to British Music.

Allan Clarke retired in February 2000. He was replaced by Carl Wayne, former lead singer of the Move. A New Zealand Hollies Greatest Hits compilation made No. 1 in that country in 2001, dislodging the Beatles' 1 collection from the top spot. While re-establishing the band as a touring attraction over 2000 to mid-2004, Carl Wayne only recorded one song with them, "How Do I Survive?" the last (and only new) track on the 2003 Greatest Hits (which reached No. 21 in the UK Album chart). After Wayne's death from cancer in August 2004, he was replaced by Peter Howarth. Shortly after, Alan Coates left the band and was replaced by Steve Lauri.

The Hollies charted at No. 21 in the UK in 2003 with the compilation album Greatest Hits from EMI in CD format. (EMI has released most of the Hollies' EMI music on CD over the past 25 years.)

The Hollies were inducted into the 'Vocal Group Hall of Fame' in the US in 2006. Also in 2006, the Hollies' first new studio album since 1983, Staying Power, was released by EMI featuring Peter Howarth on lead vocals.

The group released a studio album, Then, Now, Always, in late March 2009, again featuring Peter Howarth on lead vocals. The album was later given an official release by EMI in 2010 with the addition of an extra original song, "She'd Kill for Me".

In recognition of their achievements, the Hollies were inducted to the Rock and Roll Hall of Fame in 2010. In the same year, a compilation album, Midas Touch: The Very Best of The Hollies, charted in the UK at No. 23.

In 2012, the Hollies released Hollies Live Hits! We Got The Tunes!, a live Double CD featuring the Hollies' live performances recorded during the band's 2012 UK Tour.

In 2013, the Hollies 50th year was packed with a worldwide 50th Anniversary Concert Tour performing over 60 concerts.

In 2014, EMI released a 3CD compilation; 50 At Fifty which concluded with one new song; "Skylarks" written by Bobby Elliott, Peter Howarth and Steve Vickers.

Original bassist Eric Haydock died on 5 January 2019 at the age of 75.

During 2021, two new books were published, each detailing the career of the band. The first was Bobby Elliott's autobiography "It Ain't Heavy, It's My Story", which told the story through Bobby's own perspective. The second one was by UK author Malcolm C. Searles, entitled "Riding the Carousel", which covered the entire career of the group across its 600 pages.

In the United States

The Hollies were one of the last of the major British Invasion groups to have significant chart success in the United States. Their first single was not issued in the US and, although they had a minor US hit in 1964 with "Just One Look", it was not until "Look Through Any Window" that the band reached the US Top 40. Many of their early singles that had been major hits in the UK, including "Here I Go Again", "I'm Alive", "Yes I Will" and "We're Through", failed to even reach the Top 100 in the US.

From 1966 until after they signed to Epic in 1967, the band had their most concentrated success in the US, including four Top 15 songs ("Bus Stop", "Stop Stop Stop", "On a Carousel", and "Carrie Anne"). The move to Epic followed by Graham Nash's departure ended this streak. But they had a few more huge hits: "He Ain't Heavy, He's My Brother" (No. 7, 1969), "Long Cool Woman" (No. 2, 1972), and "The Air That I Breathe" (No. 6, 1974). They did have additional US chart hits with the non-UK singles "Pay You Back with Interest" (No. 28 in 1966), "Dear Eloise" (No. 50 in 1967), "Long Dark Road" (No. 26 in 1972), and the "reunion" single "Stop! In the Name of Love" (No. 29 in 1983).

Rock and Roll Hall of Fame
In 2010, the Hollies were inducted into the Rock and Roll Hall of Fame. The band members inducted were Allan Clarke, Graham Nash, Tony Hicks, Eric Haydock, Bobby Elliott, Bernie Calvert, and Terry Sylvester.

Band members

 Tony Hicks – lead guitar, backing vocals (1963–present)
 Bobby Elliott – drums (1963–present)
 Ray Stiles – bass (1986–1990, 1991–present)
 Ian Parker – keyboards (1991–present)
 Peter Howarth – lead vocals, rhythm guitar (2004–present)
 Steve Lauri – rhythm guitar, backing vocals (2004–present)

Discography

 Stay with The Hollies (1964)
 In The Hollies Style (1964)
 Hollies (1965)
 Would You Believe? (1966)
 For Certain Because (1966)
 Evolution (1967)
 Butterfly (1967)
 Hollies Sing Dylan (1969)
 Hollies Sing Hollies (1969)
 Confessions of the Mind (1970)
 Distant Light (1971)
 Romany (1972)
 Out on the Road (1973)
 Hollies (1974)
 Another Night (1975)
 Write On (1976)
 Russian Roulette (1976)
 A Crazy Steal (1978)
 Five Three One-Double Seven o Four (1979)
 Buddy Holly (1980)
 What Goes Around... (1983)
 Staying Power (2006)
 Then, Now, Always'' (2009)

References

External links

 
 The Legends of the Sixties
 Scandinavian Hollies site
 Rock and Roll Biographies. (2000). The Hollies
 
 Riding the Carousel
 
 

 
English rock music groups
English pop music groups
British soft rock music groups
Musical groups from Manchester
Musical groups established in 1962
Beat groups
British Invasion artists
Parlophone artists
Imperial Records artists
Liberty Records artists
Polydor Records artists
Epic Records artists
Capitol Records artists
Ivor Novello Award winners
Graham Nash
Hansa Records artists
1962 establishments in England